Boswinger is a village in south Cornwall, England, two miles south of Mevagissey (where the 2011 Census population is included). There is a youth hostel in a former farmhouse.

Boswinger is in the Cornwall Area of Outstanding Natural Beauty (AONB).

References

External links

Villages in Cornwall